The 2012 Virginia Cavaliers baseball team represented the University of Virginia in the 2012 NCAA Division I baseball season.   Head Coach Brian O'Connor is in his 9th year coaching the Cavaliers. They are coming off a 2011 season, in which they reached the College World Series.

Personnel

Schedule 

|-
! style="background:#FF7F00; color:#0D3268;" | Regular Season
|- 

|- align="center" bgcolor="#ffbbb"
| February 17 || vs  || || Conway, S.C. || 5–3 || || ||  || || 0–1 || –
|- align="center" bgcolor="#ccffcc"
| February 18 || vs Coastal Carolina || || Conway, S.C. || 9–3 || || || ||  || 1–1 || –
|- align="center" bgcolor="ffffff"
| February 18 ||  || || BB&T Coastal Field || 4–4 ||  || ||  ||  || 1–1–1 || –
|- align="center" bgcolor="#ccffcc"
| February 21 ||   || || Davenport Field || 6–511 || || || || || 2–1–1 || –
|- align="center" bgcolor="#ccffcc"
| February 24 ||  || || Davenport Field || 18–4 || || || ||   || 3–1–1 || –
|- align="center" bgcolor="#ccffcc"
| February 25 || Monmouth ||  || Davenport Field || 7–1 || || ||  ||   || 4–1–1 || –
|- align="center" bgcolor="#ccffcc"
| February 26 || Monmouth ||  || Davenport Field || 13–1 || ||  || ||   || 5–1–1 || –
|- align="center" bgcolor="#ffbbb"
| February 28 ||  ||  ||Davenport Field || 8–0 || || || ||  || 5–2–1 || –

|- align="center" bgcolor="#bbbbbb"
| March 2 ||  ||  || Davenport Field  || colspan=7|Canceled
|- align="center" bgcolor="#ccffcc"
| March 3 ||  ||  || Davenport Field || 10–4 || || || || || 6–2–1 || –
|- align="center" bgcolor="#ffbbb"
| March 3 || Wright State||  || Davenport Field || 5–4 || || || ||   || 6–3–1 || –
|- align="center" bgcolor="#ffbbb"
| March 4 || Seton Hall||  || Davenport Field || 5–2 || || || || || 6–4–1 || –
|- align="center" bgcolor="#ccffcc"
| March 6 ||  || || Veterans Mem. Park || 14–6 || Young (1–0) || Cody (1–1) ||  || 917 || 7–4–1 || –
|- align="center" bgcolor="#ffbbb"
| March 9 || * ||  || Davenport Field || 10–811 || || || ||  || 7–5–1 || 0–1
|- align="center" bgcolor="#ccffcc"
| March 10 || Virginia Tech* ||  || Davenport Field|| 4–3 ||  ||  ||  ||  || 8–5–1 || 1–1
|- align="center" bgcolor="#ccffcc"
| March 11 || Virginia Tech* ||  || Davenport Field|| 6–5 ||  ||  || ||  || 9–5–1 || 2–1
|- align="center" bgcolor="#ccffcc"
| March 13 ||  ||  || Davenport Field|| 8–5 ||  ||  || ||  || 10–5–1 || 2–1
|- align="center" bgcolor="#ccffcc"
| March 14 || Marist ||  || Davenport Field|| 10–2 ||  ||  || ||  || 11–5–1 || 2–1
|- align="center" bgcolor="#ffbbb"
| March 17 || Florida State* ||  || Mike Martin Field || 12–3 ||  ||  || ||  || 11–6–1 || 2–2
|- align="center" bgcolor="#ffbbb"
| March 18|| Florida State* || || Mike Martin Field || 4–3 ||  ||  ||  ||  || 11–7–1 || 2–3
|- align="center" bgcolor="#ffbbb"
| March 19 || Florida State* || || Mike Martin Field || 7–5 ||  ||  ||  ||  || 11–8–1 || 2–4
|- align="center" bgcolor="#ccffcc"
|March 21 ||  ||  || Davenport Field || 12–3 ||  ||  ||  ||  || 12–8–1 || 
|- align="center" bgcolor="#ccffcc"
| March 23 || Clemson* || || Davenport Field || 6–3 ||  ||  || ||  || 13–8–1 || 3–4
|- align="center" bgcolor="#ccffcc"
| March 24 || Clemson* || || Davenport Field || 5–1 ||  ||  || ||  || 14–8–1 || 4–4
|- align="center" bgcolor="#ccffcc"
| March 25 || Clemson* ||  || Davenport Field || 5–3 ||  ||  || ||  || 15–8–1 || 5–4
|- align="center" bgcolor="#ccffcc"
| March 27 ||  ||  || Davenport Field || 8–0 ||  ||  || ||  || 16–8–1 || 
|- align="center" bgcolor="#ccffcc"
| March 28 || Towson ||  || Davenport Field || 19–5 ||  ||  || ||  || 17–8–1 || 
|- align="center" bgcolor="#ffbbb"
| March 30 || * || || Doak Field || 5–1 || Ogburn (3–1) || Silverstein (2–3) || || 1,942 || 17–9–1 || 5–5
|- align="center" bgcolor="#ccffcc"
| March 31 || NC State* || || Doak Field || 5–2 ||  ||  ||  ||  || 18–9–1 || 6–5

|- align="center" bgcolor="#ffbbb"
| April 1 || NC State* || || Doak Field || 7–6 ||  ||  || ||  || 18–10–1 || 6–6
|- align="center" bgcolor="#ccffcc"
| April 4 ||  || || Davenport Field || 15–5 ||  ||  || ||  || 19–10–1 || 
|- align="center" bgcolor="#ccffcc"
|April 7 || * ||  || Davenport Field || 9–4 ||  ||  ||  ||  || 20–10–1 || 7–6
|- align="center" bgcolor="#ccffcc"
|April 8 || Wake Forest* || || Davenport Field || 4–1 ||  ||  ||  || || 21–10–1 || 8–6
|- align="center" bgcolor="#ccffcc"
|April 9 || Wake Forest* || || Davenport Field || 11–2 ||  ||  ||  || || 22–10–1 || 9–6
|- align="center" bgcolor="#ccffcc"
|April 11 ||  || || Davenport Field || 16–4 ||  ||  ||  || || 23–10–1 || 
|- align="center" bgcolor="#ffbbb"
|April 13 || * || || Davenport Field || 2–110 ||  ||  || ||  || 23–11–1 || 9–7
|- align="center" bgcolor="#ffbbb"
|April 14 || North Carolina* || || Davenport Field || 6–2 ||  ||  ||  ||  || 23–12–1 || 9–8
|- align="center" bgcolor="#ffbbb"
|April 15 || North Carolina* || || Davenport Field || 5–3 ||  || || || || 23–13–1 || 9–9
|- align="center" bgcolor="#ccffcc"
|April 17 ||  || || Davenport Field || 7–5 ||  || ||  ||  || 24–13–1 || 
|- align="center" bgcolor="#ffbbb"
|April 20 || * || || Duke  || 6–3 ||  ||  ||  ||  || 24–14–1 || 9–10
|- align="center" bgcolor="#ccffcc"
|April 21 || Duke* ||  || Duke  || 12–3 ||  ||  ||  ||  || 25–14–1 || 10–10
|- align="center" bgcolor="#ccffcc"
|April 21 || Duke* ||  || Duke  || 10–3 ||  ||  ||  ||  || 26–14–1 || 11–10
|- align="center" bgcolor="#ccffcc"
|April 24 || Radford ||  || Davenport Field || 3–211 ||  ||  ||  ||  || 27–14–1 || 
|- align="center" bgcolor="#ccffcc"
|April 25 || at VCU ||  || The Diamond || 7–5 ||  ||  ||  ||  || 28–14–1 || 
|- align="center" bgcolor="#ccffcc"
|April 28 || * || || Mark Light Field|| 7–3 || Kline (6–3) || Erickson (6–5) || || 2,750 || 29–14–1 || 12–10
|- align="center" bgcolor="#ccffcc"
|April 29 || Miami (FL)* || || Mark Light Field || 7–4 || || || ||  || 30–14–1 || 13–10
|- align="center" bgcolor="#ccffcc"
|April 30 || Miami (FL)* || || Mark Light Field || 3–4 || || || || || 31–14–1 || 14–10

|- align="center" bgcolor="#bbbbbb"
| May 1 ||  ||  || Davenport Field || colspan=7|Canceled
|- align="center" bgcolor="#ccffcc "
|May 9 ||  ||  || Davenport Field || 12–3 ||  ||  ||  ||  || 32–14–1 || 
|- align="center" bgcolor="#ccffcc "
|May 11 || * ||  || Davenport Field || 6–5 || ||  ||  ||  || 33–14–1 || 15–10
|- align="center" bgcolor="#ccffcc "
| May 12 || Georgia Tech* ||  || Davenport Field || 4–2 ||  ||  || ||  || 34–14–1 || 16–10
|- align="center" bgcolor="#ffbbb "
| May 13 || Georgia Tech* || || Davenport Field || 5–110 ||  ||  || ||  || 34–15–1 || 16–11
|- align="center" bgcolor="#bbbbbb"
| May 15 || VCU ||  || Davenport Field || colspan=7|Canceled
|- align="center" bgcolor="#ccffcc"
| May 17 || *|| || Shipley Field || 7–6 || K. Crockett (4–2) || Harman (6–4) || Thompson (11)|| 639 || 35–15–1 || 17–11
|- align="center" bgcolor="#ccffcc"
| May 18 || Maryland* || || Shipley Field || 10–3 || || || ||  || 36–15–1 || 18–11
|- align="center" bgcolor="#ffbbb"
| May 19 || Maryland* || || Shipley Field|| 6–5 ||  ||  ||  ||  || 36–16–1 || 18–12

|-
! style="background:#FF7F00; color:#0D3268;" | Postseason
|- 

|- align="center" bgcolor="#ccffcc"
| May 24 || Clemson || 17 || NewBridge Bank Park || 3–2 ||  ||  || ||  || 1–0
|- align="center" bgcolor="#ffbbb"
| May 25 || Georgia Tech || 17 || NewBridge Bank Park || 17–5 ||  ||  || ||  || 1–1
|- align="center" bgcolor="ccffcc"
| May 26 || #1 Florida State || 17 || NewBridge Bank Park || 7–0 || Lewicki (4–2) || Compton (10–2) || || 3,642 || 2–1

|- align="center" bgcolor="#ccffcc"
| June 2 || (4)  ||  || Davenport Field || 6–2 ||  ||  ||  ||  || 1–0
|- align="center" bgcolor="#ffbbb"
| June 3 || (3)  ||  || Davenport Field || 6–5 ||  ||  ||  ||  || 1–1
|- align="center" bgcolor="ffbbb"
| June 3 || (2)  ||  || Davenport Field || 5–4 ||  ||  ||  ||   || 1–2

|-
| Rankings from USA TODAY/ESPN Top 25 coaches' baseball poll. Parenthesis indicate tournament seedings.*ACC Conference games
|-

References 

Virginia Cavaliers
Virginia Cavaliers baseball seasons
Virginia
Virgin